Battle of Kremmer Levee was a final battle of Brandenburg–Pomeranian War, fought on 1 August 1332, on the Kremmer Levee, near the village of Kremmen. It was fought by forces of Pomerania-Stettin, Werle, and County of Schwerin, against the Margraviate of Brandenburg.

History 
In 1329, dukes Otto I and Barnim III, the co-rulers of Pomerania-Stettin, had allied themselves with Werle and County of Schwerin, following which, they attacked the Margraviate of Brandenburg. The war lasted until 1 August 1332, when, Pomeranian forces had won during the battle of Kremmer Levee.

In popular culture 
Theodor Fontane had written a folk song (Lied) about the battle.

Citations

Notes

References

Bibliography 
 Martin Wehrmann, Geschichte von Pommern, vol. 1, 2. Friedrich Andreas Perthes, Gotha 1919–21. Reprint by Weltbild Verlag, 1992, ISBN 3-89350-112-6.
 Edward Rymar, Jedna bitwa pomorsko-brandenburska na Kremskiej Grobli (w 1412 r.) i bitwa Barnima III księcia szczecińskiego z Wedlami (w 1332 r.) in: Kaci, święci, templariusze, Błażej Śliwiński (redictor), Studia z Dziejów Średniowiecza nr 14
 Theodor Fontane, Wanderungen durch die Mark Brandenburg, vol. 5.

Kremmer Levee 1332
History of Brandenburg
History of Pomerania
Conflicts in 1332
14th century in Europe
14th century in the Holy Roman Empire